The 2015 BNP Paribas de Nouvelle-Calédonie was a professional tennis tournament played on hard courts. It was the twelfth edition of the tournament which was part of the 2015 ATP Challenger Tour. It took place in Nouméa, New Caledonia on 5–10 January 2015.

Singles main-draw entrants

Seeds

 1 Rankings are as of December 22, 2014.

Other entrants
The following players received wildcards into the singles main draw:
  Mathias Bourgue
  Laurent Lokoli
  Adrian Mannarino
  Johan-Sébastien Tatlot

The following players received entry from the qualifying draw:
  Guilherme Clezar
  Jared Donaldson
  Bjorn Fratangelo
  Marco Trungelliti

Champions

Singles

 Steve Darcis def.  Adrián Menéndez Maceiras 6–3, 6–2

Doubles

 Austin Krajicek /  Tennys Sandgren def.  Jarmere Jenkins /  Bradley Klahn 7–6(7–2), 6–7(5–7), [10–5]

External links
Official Website

BNP Paribas de Nouvelle-Caledonie
Internationaux de Nouvelle-Calédonie
Inter
2015 in French tennis